Reginald Michael Cawcutt (25 October 1938 – 5 August 2022) was a South African Roman Catholic prelate.

Cawcutt was born in Rugby, Western Cape. His father, Wilfred, was a well-known horse trainer. He studied for the priesthood at St John Vianney Seminary in Pretoria and was ordained by Archbishop Owen McCann on 9 July 1962. Soon after his ordination, he became chaplain to the deaf community of Cape Town, serving in both of Cape Town's two Catholic institutions for the hearing-impaired. In 1966, he made a three-day pastoral visit to the remote island of Tristan de Cunha, where he administered the sacraments to the small Catholic community of 50, which rarely saw a priest. For many years he served as Catholic chaplain to the South African navy. 

He served as auxiliary bishop of Egabro and as Auxiliary Bishop of the Archdiocese of Cape Town, South Africa, from 1992 until his retirement in 2002. As auxiliary bishop, he would live in Milnerton, a suburb on the Table Bay coast, near where he had been raised.

Cawcutt resigned in July 2002. This followed allegations that he had outed himself as gay on a sometimes-sexually charged website set up for gay priests. Cawcutt blamed the scandal on the conservative U.S.-based organization Roman Catholic Faithful, which had infiltrated the now closed website (which had been known as "St. Sebastian's Angels") and traced posting addresses. In his letter of resignation, Cawcutt stated that he did not wish to be a source of division in the Archdiocese.

References 

1928 births
2022 deaths
20th-century Roman Catholic bishops in South Africa
21st-century Roman Catholic bishops in South Africa
Bishops appointed by Pope John Paul II
People from the Western Cape